Rhuma is a genus of moths in the family Geometridae.

Species
Rhuma argyraspis (Lower, 1893)
Rhuma divergens (Goldfinch, 1929)
Rhuma subaurata Walker, 1860
Rhuma thiobapta (Turner, 1936)

References
Natural History Museum Lepidoptera genus database

Pseudoterpnini
Geometridae genera